Drapacz  is a settlement in the administrative district of Gmina Herby, within Lubliniec County, Silesian Voivodeship, in southern Poland.

The settlement has a population of 9.

References

Drapacz